Jnanendra Chandra Majumdar (also Janendra Chandra Majumder) was an anti-colonial Bengali politician, and a representative of East Pakistan to the Constituent Assembly of Pakistan. 

A long-time associate of Indian National Congress, Majumdar sided with Sarat Bose during the evolution of All India Forward Bloc faction. In 1940, he won a bye-election from East Mymensingh —a dual-member rural constituency— to the Bengal Provincial Assembly, drubbing Satish Chandra Ray Chowdhuri, the official Congress candidate, with considerable organizational support from Bose.

In 1946, Majumdar re-stood as an independent candidate, but failed to be re-elected; nonetheless, he was elected by the Assembly as a Congress candidate to the Constituent Assembly of India. After partition, Mymensingh went to Pakistan and Majumdar became a member of the Constituent Assembly of Pakistan.

Notes

References

Pakistani MNAs 1947–1954
Year of birth missing
Place of birth missing
Year of death missing
Place of death missing
Members of the Constituent Assembly of Pakistan